The stay apparatus is a group of ligaments, tendons and muscles which "lock" major joints in the limbs of the horse. It is best known as the mechanism by which horses can enter a light sleep while still standing up.  It does, however, exist in other large land mammals, where it plays a role in reducing fatigue while standing. The stay apparatus allows animals to relax their muscles and doze without collapsing. (Horses are able to sleep lying down as well.)

The stay apparatus is an arrangement of muscles, tendons and ligaments that work together so that an animal can remain standing with virtually no muscular effort.  The effect is that an animal can distribute its weight on three limbs while resting a fourth in a flexed, non-weight bearing position. The animal can periodically shift its weight to rest a different leg and thus all limbs are able to be individually rested, reducing overall wear and tear.  The relatively slim legs of certain large mammals such as horses and cows would be subject to dangerous levels of fatigue if not for the stay apparatus.

The lower part of the stay apparatus consists of the suspensory apparatus, which is the same in both front and hind legs, while the upper portion of the stay apparatus is different between the fore and hind limbs.

In the front legs, the stay apparatus automatically engages when the animal's muscles relax. The upper portion of the stay apparatus in the forelimbs includes the major attachment, extensor and flexor muscles and tendons. In essence, the accessory check ligaments act as tension bands, they stabilize the carpus (called the "knee" in horses), fetlock and bones of the foot. In the upper portion, the shoulder and elbow joints have several musculo-tendinous structures that keep these joints in passive extension.

In the hind limbs, the major muscles, ligaments and tendons work with the reciprocal joints of the hock and stifle, which are a reciprocal apparatus that forces the hock and stifle to flex and extend in unison. The medial patellar ligament "locks" the patella ("kneecap") in place and this prevents flexion in both the stifle and the hock.  At the stifle joint, a "hook" structure on the inside bottom end of the femur cups the patella and the medial patella ligament, prevents the leg from bending.

Cattle have a stay apparatus which allows them to rest individual limbs, but cattle generally do not sleep standing up.

Anatomical structures important in the stay apparatus include:
The suspensory apparatus, including the superficial and deep digital flexor tendons along with the proximal and distal check ligaments.  The distal sesamoidean ligaments run from the sesamoid bones to the two pastern bones. 
Biceps brachii: originates from the caudal side of the scapula and inserts into the radial tuberosity. Flexes the elbow, and is the part of the stay apparatus that keeps the elbow and shoulder from bending.
Triceps brachii: has three heads which originate and insert into separate places: the caudal side of the scapula and into the lateral & caudal side of the olecranon, from the humerus and into the lateral side of the olecranon, and from the medial side of the humerus and into the medial and cranial side of the olecranon. The triceps brachii is the most important extensor of the elbow. Important part of the stay apparatus to keep the elbow fixed.
Extensor carpi radialis: originates from the humerus, continues distally along the dorsal side of the radius, and inserts on the metacarpal tuberosity. Flexes the elbow, extends the carpus. Also used in the stay apparatus to fix the carpus. 
The patellar tendon and patellar ligaments.

The most common of the ancient, now-extinct wild horse species in North America, Dinohippus, had a distinctive passive stay apparatus that helped it conserve energy while standing for long periods. Dinohippus was the first horse to show a rudimentary form of this characteristic, and its existence provided additional evidence of the close relationship between Dinohippus and the modern Equus.

References

 

Horse anatomy